Yanshan Temple is a preserved location of national historical and cultural relics. It used to be named Lingyan Temple (灵岩寺). It is located in Tianyan Village of north side of Mount Wutai, Yukou, south of Fanshi County, Shanxi Province of China.

It was founded in Zhenglong 3rd year (1158), Jin dynasty, and renovated in Yuan, Ming, and Qing dynasties.

External links
Yanshan Monastery, Architectura Sinica Site Archive

References 

Buddhist temples in Xinzhou
Major National Historical and Cultural Sites in Shanxi